Büsra Barut (born 20 May 1997), also known as Büşra Barut in Turkish spelling, is a Danish-born Turkish footballer who plays as a forward for the Turkey women's national team. She has previously been a member of the Denmark women's national under-19 team.

Personal life 
Barut was born on 20 May 1997 in Ganløse, Egedal Municipality, Denmark.

In November 2021, she revealed that she has a relationship with footballer Joakim Mæhle, with whom she has exact the same birthdate.

Club career 
Barut played two seasons for Brøndby IF in the 3F League before she joined Farum BK, which was integrated into FC Nordsjælland in 2018. She is a member of FC Nordsjælland.

International career 
Denmark women's national U19
Barut was admitted to the Denmark women's national U19 team and took part at the 2016 UEFA Women's Under-19 Championship qualification matches in 2015 and 2016, scoring one goal.

Turkey women's national
She was called up by the Turkey women's national team to play at the UEFA Women's Euro 2021 qualifying Group A matches.

Honours 
 3F League
 Brøndby IF
 Runners-up (1):  2017–18

 Danish Women's Cup
 Brøndby IF
 Winners (1): 2018

References

External links 
 
 
 
Mackolik

1997 births
Living people
Citizens of Turkey through descent
Turkish women's footballers
Women's association football forwards
Turkey women's international footballers
People from Egedal Municipality
Danish women's footballers
Danish people of Turkish descent
Brøndby IF (women) players
FC Nordsjælland (women) players
Sportspeople from the Capital Region of Denmark